Haplochromis schubotzi is a species of cichlid found in the Democratic Republic of the Congo and Uganda where it occurs in Lake George, Lake Edward and the Kazinga Channel.  This species reaches a length of  SL. Its specific name honours the German zoologist Johann G. Hermann Schubotz (1881-1955), who was a member of the Deutsche Zentral-Afrika Expedition of 1907–1908, on which he collected many specimens of fishes, amongst which was the type of this species.

References

schubotzi
Fish described in 1914
Taxonomy articles created by Polbot